According to the Book of Mormon, Amaleki was a Nephite record keeper (ca 130 BC).  He received the plates of Nephi from his father Abinadom, and penned 18 verses in the Book of Omni (Omni 1:12-30). He was the last person to write in the small plates of Nephi.

In his brief contribution to the Book of Mormon, Amaleki relates the flight of King Mosiah I and his people from the land of Nephi,  and the subsequent discovery of the people and land of Zarahemla, who, like the Nephites, were descendants of the Israelites of the old world.  Amaleki's writing also introduce the Jaredites for the first time in the Book of Mormon, since the people of Zarahemla had contact with Coriantumr, the last surviving Jaredite.

Before his death, Amaleki passed the Nephite record to King Benjamin, who was the son of Mosiah.

Etymology
According to Hugh Nibley, the name Amaleki simply means "my king."

Influence
Bruce R. McConkie once said: "Amaleki explained that 'there is nothing which is good save it comes from the Lord:  and that which is evil cometh from the devil' (Omni 1:25; see also Alma 5:40).  This is the great litmus test for determining the truthfulness or rightness of a matter- does it invite and entice one to come unto God, to partake of his goodness and grace, to enjoy the fruits of his Spirit, to gain in time those godly attributes and godly powers which will equip the person to be with and be like God?  If it does so, it is of God."

Family tree

References

Further reading

Book of Mormon people